Rake Hanger is a  biological Site of Special Scientific Interest north-west of Midhurst in West Sussex.

Sessile oak is dominant on the steep slope of this site, while alder is the most common tree at the waterlogged foot of the scarp. There are lichens associated with ancient woodland, such as Thelotrema lepadinum and Haematomma elatinum. Great tussock sedge, bur-reed and great reedmace grow on the banks of two ponds.

A public footpath goes through the site.

References

Sites of Special Scientific Interest in West Sussex
Forests and woodlands of West Sussex